Paul-Claude Racamier (20 May 1924 – 18 August 1996) was a French psychiatrist and psychoanalyst, born in Doubs.

1924 births
1996 deaths
French psychiatrists
French psychoanalysts
20th-century French physicians